Boughen is a surname. Notable people with the surname include:

 Edward Boughen (1587–1660?), English royalist divine
 Ray Boughen (1937–2022), Canadian politician

See also
 Boughey